The 1985–86 Kentucky Wildcats men's basketball team represented University of Kentucky in the 1985–86 NCAA Division I men's basketball season. The head coach was Eddie Sutton and the team finished the season with an overall record of 32–4.

Roster

Schedule and Results

|-
!colspan=9 style=| Non-Conference Regular Season

|-
!colspan=9 style=| SEC Regular Season

|-
!colspan=9 style=| SEC Tournament

|-
!colspan=9 style=| NCAA Tournament

References 

Kentucky Wildcats men's basketball seasons
Kentucky
Kentucky
Kentucky Wildcats
Kentucky Wildcats